Flavobacterium branchiicola  is a bacterium from the genus of Flavobacterium.

References

External links
Type strain of Flavobacterium branchiicola at BacDive -  the Bacterial Diversity Metadatabase

 

branchiicola
Bacteria described in 2016